Gloria Usieta (born 19 June 1977) is a Nigerian former football midfielder who played for the Nigeria women's national football team at the 1999 Women's World Cup, and at the 2000 Summer Olympics.

See also
 Nigeria at the 2000 Summer Olympics

References

External links
 
 

1977 births
Living people
Nigerian women's footballers
Place of birth missing (living people)
Footballers at the 2000 Summer Olympics
Olympic footballers of Nigeria
Women's association football midfielders
1999 FIFA Women's World Cup players
Nigeria women's international footballers